B4, B04, B.IV or B-4 may refer to:

Transportation

Aviation
 Auster B.4, 1951 British light transport aircraft with rear ramp
 B.A.C.H. Flugbetriebs IATA airline designator (ICAO BCF)
 Bankair IATA code, ICAO airline designator (BKA)
 Bensen B-4, Bensen Aircraft autogyro
 Bäumer B IV Sausewind, German 1920s sports aircraft
 Flyglobespan IATA airline designator
 Fokker B.IV, parent company's designation for American branch's F.11 seaplane
 Hawker B 4, Swedish designation for Hawker Hart biplane
 Keystone B-4, United States biplane bomber
 Lohner B.IV, an Austro-Hungarian World War 1 reconnaissance biplane
 Pilatus B-4, Swiss glider also designated PC-11.

Locomotives
 Alsace-Lorraine B 4, an Alsace-Lorraine P 1 class steam locomotive
 Bavarian B IV, an 1852 German steam locomotive
 GSR Class B4, a former Cork, Bandon and South Coast Railway steam locomotive of the Great Southern Railways, Ireland
 LSWR B4 class, an 1891 British dock tank locomotive
 PRR B4, an American Pennsylvania Railroad steam locomotive
 Soo Line B-4 class, an American 0-6-0 steam locomotive
 LB&SCR B4 class, a British tender locomotive class
 LNER Class B4, a British class of locomotives

Automotive uses
 Subaru B4, the name under which the Subaru Legacy is marketed in Israel
 B4 (New York City bus), serving Brooklyn
 B4 road (Namibia)
 Bundesstraße 4, federal highway in Germany

In the military

 HMS B4, a British B-class submarine of the Royal Navy
 Keystone B-4, a United States Army Air Corps biplane bomber
 SM UB-4, a 1915 German U-boat
 203-mm howitzer M1931 (B-4, "Stalins Hammer"), a World War II Soviet ordnance piece
 B-4 a US Air Force/USAAF flight bag
 A level of vehicle armour

In science 
 Leukotriene B4 receptor and Leukotriene B4 receptor 2, two human genes
 Lipoxin B4, a lipoxin
 Proanthocyanidin B4, a B type proanthocyanidin
 Vitamin B4, an alternate name for adenine
 A stellar classification

In entertainment
 B4 (music show), a defunct British music video show broadcast on Channel 4
 B4 (TV channel), a defunct British music television channel
 B-4 (Star Trek), an android in the Star Trek fictional universe
 Babylon 4 space station, predecessor to Babylon 5 from the Babylon 5 television series
The Lost City (B4), a Dungeons & Dragons adventure module

Other uses
 B4 (classification), a parasports classification for visually impaired athletes
 B4 Street Fighter Championships, a 2000 fighting game tournament
 B4 or B4 II, a Native Instruments virtual synthesizer for Hammond organ (B-3) sound emulation
 B4-mount, used for professional video cameras such as Betacam
 An international standard paper size (250×353 mm), defined in ISO 216
 B04, Alekhine's Defence chess code
 1. b4, Sokolsky Opening in chess

See also
 Before (disambiguation)
 BIV (disambiguation)